RS-102221 is a drug developed by Hoffmann–La Roche, which was one of the first compounds discovered that acts as a potent and selective antagonist at the serotonin 5-HT2C receptor, with around 100x selectivity over the closely related 5-HT2A and 5-HT2B receptors. It has anxiolytic effects in animal studies, increases the effectiveness of SSRI antidepressants, and shows a complex interaction with cocaine, increasing some effects but decreasing others, reflecting a role for the 5-HT2C receptor in regulation of the dopamine signalling system in the brain.

See also 
 CEPC
 SB-242084
Hydantoin

References 

5-HT2C antagonists
Imides
Ureas
Lactams
Nitrogen heterocycles
Aromatic ketones
Phenol ethers
Trifluoromethyl compounds
Spiro compounds
Sulfonamides
Hydantoins